Gandoh is a tehsil in district Doda of the Indian union territory of Jammu and Kashmir. The village is located on Thathri-Gandoh National Highway.

See Also
Thathri-Gandoh National Highway

References

Cities and towns in Doda district
Bhaderwah
Chenab Valley